Nje (Њ њ; italics: Њ њ) is a letter of the Cyrillic script.

It is a ligature of the Cyrillic letters En  and Soft Sign . It was invented by Vuk Stefanović Karadžić for use in his 1818 dictionary, replacing the earlier digraph . It corresponds to the digraph  in Gaj's Latin alphabet for Serbo-Croatian.

Polish , Czech and Slovak , Latvian ⟨ņ⟩, Galician and Spanish , Occitan, Portuguese and Vietnamese , Catalan and Hungarian , and Italian and French ).

Nje is commonly transliterated as  but it is also transliterated  or

Related letters and other similar characters
Н н : Cyrillic letter En
Ь ь : Cyrillic letter Soft sign
Ñ ñ : Latin letter N with tilde - a Filipino, Spanish, and Tetum letter
Ń ń : Latin letter N with acute - a Kashubian, Polish, and Sorbian letter
Ň ň : Latin letter N with caron - a Czech, Turkmen, and Slovak letter
Ņ ņ : Latin letter N with cedilla - a Latvian letter
Љ љ : Cyrillic letter Lje

Computing codes

See also
Iotation

References

External links

IBM EBCDIC (Cyrillic Russian) encoding - Windows charsets 

Cyrillic ligatures
Serbian letters

bs:Nj
hr:Nj
sh:NJ